Johnny Loper is a pioneering American gasser drag racer.

Driving a 1959 Chevrolet, he won NHRA's E/Gas national title at Detroit Dragway in 1959.

The next year, at the wheel of an Oldsmobile-powered 1941 Willys, he won NHRA's first ever B/Gas Altered (B/GA) national title at Detroit Dragway.

At the NHRA Nationals, held at Indianapolis Raceway Park, in 1962, Loper won the B/Gas title, with a Chevrolet-powered  Willys.

Loper was first three-time national champion to move up a class in his later wins, from E/G to B/G.

Loper was also first ever B/Gas Altered champion, in 1960.

References

Sources
Davis, Larry. Gasser Wars, North Branch, MN:  Cartech, 2003, pp. 181–2.

Dragster drivers
American racing drivers